is the 28th single by the Japanese girl idol group Berryz Kobo. It was released in Japan on March 21, 2012, and debuted at number 9 on the Oricon weekly CD singles chart.

Track listings

CD single 
 
 
 "Be Genki (Naseba Naru!)" (Instrumental)

 Limited Edition A DVD
 "Be Genki (Naseba Naru!)" (Dance Shot Ver.)
 
 Limited Edition B DVD
 "Be Genki (Naseba Naru!)" (Close-up Ver.)

DVD single Single V "Be Genki (Naseba Naru!)" 
 "Be Genki (Naseba Naru!)"
 "Be Genki (Naseba Naru!)" (Other Ver.)

DVD single Event V "Be Genki (Naseba Naru!)" 
 "Be Genki (Naseba Naru!)" (Shimizu Saki Close-up Ver.)
 "Be Genki (Naseba Naru!)" (Tsugunaga Momoko Close-up Ver.)
 "Be Genki (Naseba Naru!)" (Tokunaga Chinami Close-up Ver.)
 "Be Genki (Naseba Naru!)" (Sudo Maasa Close-up Ver.)
 "Be Genki (Naseba Naru!)" (Natsuyaki Miyabi Close-up Ver.)
 "Be Genki (Naseba Naru!)" (Kumai Yurina Close-up Ver.)
 "Be Genki (Naseba Naru!)" (Sugaya Risako Close-up Ver.)

Charts

CD single

DVD single Single V "Be Genki (Naseba Naru!)"

References

External links 
 Profile on the Up-Front Works official website

2012 singles
2012 songs
Japanese-language songs
Berryz Kobo songs
Songs written by Tsunku
Piccolo Town singles